The Men's Abierto Mexicano de Raquetas 2013 is the men's edition of the 2013 Abierto Mexicano de Raquetas, which is a tournament of the PSA World Tour event International (Prize money: $70,000). The event took place in Toluca in Mexico from 19 to 22 September. Grégory Gaultier won his second Abierto Mexicano de Raquetas trophy, beating Mohamed El Shorbagy in the final.

Prize money and ranking points
For 2013, the prize purse was $70,000. The prize money and points breakdown is as follows:

Seeds

Draw and results

See also
 PSA World Tour 2013
 Abierto Mexicano de Raquetas

References

External links
 PSA Abierto Mexicano de Raquetas 2013 website
 Abierto Mexicano de Raquetas official website

Squash tournaments in Mexico
Abierto Mexicano de Raquetas
Abierto Mexicano de Raquetas
Abierto Mexicano de Raquetas